Eli Parsons (29 January 1748, Springfield – 26 or 30 September 1830, Oswego) He was the son of Aaron (1712-1795) and Mercy Atkinson (1713-1750) Parsons. He married Persis Graves on June 5, 1777.

Parsons was  a leading contributor to Shays' Rebellion in the developing climate of revolutionary America. One of his main contributions to the rebellion was through his letters to other members of the anti-authoritarian movement, rallying them to the cause. One such letter was captured, in part leading to his arrest and prosecution as a criminal accused of conspiracy and other charges.

References

1748 births
1830 deaths
People from Springfield, Massachusetts
People of colonial Massachusetts
Continental Army officers from Massachusetts
American activists
Burials in New York (state)